This page includes a list of biblical proper names that start with I in English transcription. Some of the names are given with a proposed etymological meaning. For further information on the names included on the list, the reader may consult the sources listed below in the References and External Links.

A – B – C – D – E – F – G – H – I – J – K – L – M – N – O – P – Q – R – S – T – U – V – Y – Z

I 

Ibhar, he will choose; chooser; God does choose
Ibleam
Ibneiah God builds Jehovah does build;
Ibnijah, whom Jehovah will build up; God builds; Jehovah is builder
Ibri Hebrew passing over of a Hebrew;
Ibsam, fragrant
Ibzan, father of a target; father of coldness splendid, active
Ichabod, inglorious the glory is not; where is the glory; inglorious
Iconium
Idalah
Idbash, honey-sweet corpulent;
Iddo God's friend affectionate; festal; his power;
Idumea
Igal, may God redeem deliverer; he will vindicate;
Igeal
Igdaliah, may God be glorified great is Jehovah
Iim
Ije-abarim
Ijon, look
Ikkesh, stubborn perverse; subtle
Ilai, exaltedsupreme
Illyricum
Imlah, full God does fill; fulfilling; plenitude
Imla, whom God will fill up replenisher
Immanuel God is with is Hebrew c. 8th century
Immer, saying; speaking; a lamb talkative; prominent
Imna, God does restrain; withdrawing
Imnah, may God defend prosperity; he allots
Imrah, a rebel stubborn; height of Jehovah
Imri, speaking; exalting; bitter; a lamb projecting; eloquent
India
Iphdeiah, may God redeem Jehovah does deliver; redemption
Ir, watcher
Ira, watcher; watchful; city watchIrad, wild ass; heap of empire; dragon fleetIram watchfulIri, Jehovah is watcherIrijah, may God see God does see; provide; fear of the LordIrpeel
Ir-shemesh
Iru, watchIsaac, he laughed laughing oneIsaiah, God's salvation Jehovah is helper; salvation is of the LordIscah, who looksIscariot, a man of murder; a hireling man of keriothIshbah, praising He praises, appeaserIshbak, free, empty, exhaustedIshbi-benob, man sitting in Nob dweller on the mount, he that predictsIshbosheth, a man of shameIshi, saving my help, savingIshiah, Jehovah exists, forgivethIshma, distinction, elevatedIshmael, God that hears hearsIshmaiah, may God hear Jehovah hearsIshmerai, God guards God keepsIshod, famed man of honor, man of splendorIshpan, firm, strongIshtob
Ishuah, Isuah, equal, self-satisfiedIshui, Jesui, equalityIshvah, resemblesIshvi, quietIsmaiah, Jehovah hearsIspah
Israel, he strives with God, ruling with GodIssachar, rewardedIsshiah, there is GodIsshijah, there is GodIsui
Ithai, God is with meItaly
Ithamar, island of the palm-tree palm-coast, palm treeIthiel, God is with me God is, God is with meIthmah, purity, bereavementIthra, excellentIthran
Ithream, populous remnant, abundance of the peopleIttah-kazin
Ittai, with me plowman, livingIturea
Ivah
Iye Abarim
Izehar
Izhar, Izehar, oil bright one, olive oilIzrahiah, may God shine forth Jehovah is appearing, does ariseIzri, creative, formerIzziah, Jeziah, Jehovah exaltsReferences
Comay, Joan, Who's Who in the Old Testament, Oxford University Press, 1971, 
Lockyer, Herbert, All the men of the Bible, Zondervan Publishing House (Grand Rapids, Michigan), 1958
Lockyer, Herbert, All the women of the Bible, Zondervan Publishing 1988, 
Lockyer, Herbert, All the Divine Names and Titles in the Bible, Zondervan Publishing 1988, 
Tischler, Nancy M., All things in the Bible: an encyclopedia of the biblical world '', Greenwood Publishing, Westport, Conn. : 2006

Inline references 

I